Lavington is a residential suburb of Nairobi. It is a neighbourhood that hosts the high middle-income to high-income segment of Nairobi residents. It is a low to medium-density residential neighbourhood. The bulk of the area now known as Lavington was originally the St Austin's Mission established by the French Holy Ghost Fathers.

The Kirichwa tributary of the Nairobi River runs through the community.

Background
The Strathmore School, Saint Mary's School, Loreto Convent School, St. Austin's Academy, Braeside High School, Nairobi International School, Braeburn High School, Lavington Primary School and Rusinga School are located in Lavington.

The area is also known for the Lavington Green Shopping Centre which has a supermarket, a bar/restaurant called Kengeles, and a number of smaller stores. The neighborhood is also home to the Jaffery Sports Club Ground.

References

External links
 Braeburn Schools
 Lavington Primary School
 Kenya Corner

Populated places in Kenya
Suburbs of Nairobi